David Gavrushevich Avanesyan (born 15 August 1988) is a Russian professional boxer. He has held the European welterweight title since 2019 and previously the WBA (Regular) welterweight title in 2017 (previously the interim title from 2015 until being promoted).

Early life
Avanesyan was born into an Armenian family in the Caucasus region of Pyatigorsk. Avanesyan was born in Tabynskoe, Russia and currently resides in Newark, Nottinghamshire, England.

Professional career

Early career
Avanesyan made his professional debut on 12 June 2009, scoring a four-round unanimous decision (UD) against Vazgen Agadzhanyan, who also debuted. In his second fight a month later, on 11 July, Avanesyan lost a six-round UD to Andrey Klimov. He would then win twelve consecutive fights over the next four years, picking up the Russian welterweight title and two WBC regional titles along the way. Avanesyan's winning streak ended on 16 March 2013, following a split draw against Aslanbek Kozaev.

WBA interim welterweight champion
2015 and 2016 were banner years for Avanesyan. On 7 November 2015 he stopped Charlie Navarro in nine rounds to win the vacant WBA interim welterweight title.

Avanesyan vs. Mosley
The biggest win of Avanesyan's career took place on 28 May 2016, when he scored a clear UD against decorated former world champion Shane Mosley to retain his title, while also making his United States debut.

WBA (Regular) welterweight champion
On 15 July 2016, the WBA announced that Keith Thurman would have to make a mandatory defence against interim champion Avanesyan. Both camps had until 13 August to negotiate the fight or purse bids would be ordered by the WBA. Due to negotiations breaking down, the WBA elevated Avanesyan to Regular champion status and Thurman was named Super champion.

Avanesyan vs. Peterson
In December 2016, early reports suggested there was a fight in the works for Avanesyan to defend the WBA (Regular) title against former light welterweight world champion Lamont Peterson. A venue in the US was being discussed for February 2017. On 11 January 2017, a spokesperson for Avanesyan announced the fight would take place on 18 February at the Cintas Center in Cincinnati, Ohio, as part of the undercard to Adrien Broner vs. Adrían Granados, aired by Showtime. Avanesyan failed to make a successful first defence of his title, losing a close UD to Peterson in fight which was described as "highly competitive and entertaining" by ESPN. Two judges scored it 116–112 and the third had it closer at 115–113, all in favor of Peterson. Avanesyan earned a purse of $75,000, while Peterson earned $250,000.

Avanesyan vs. Kelly 
On February 20, 2021, Avanesyan fought Josh Kelly, who was ranked #15 by the IBF at welterweight. Avanesyan won the fight via sixth-round TKO.

Avanesyan vs. Taylor 
In his next bout, Avanesyan fought and defeated Liam Taylor via second round TKO.

Professional boxing record

References

External links

David Avanesyan - Profile, News Archive & Current Rankings at Box.Live

1988 births
Living people
Russian male boxers
Welterweight boxers
Russian people of Armenian descent
People from Pyatigorsk
World Boxing Association champions
World welterweight boxing champions
European Boxing Union champions
Sportspeople from Stavropol Krai